
Gmina Kożuchów is an urban-rural gmina (administrative district) in Nowa Sól County, Lubusz Voivodeship, in western Poland.

Villages
Apart from the town of Kożuchów, Gmina Kożuchów contains the villages and settlements of Bielice, Broniszów, Bulin, Cisów, Czciradz, Drwalewice, Dziadoszyce, Dziwiszowice, Kierzkowice, Książ Śląski, Lasocin, Mirocin Dolny, Mirocin Górny, Mirocin Średni, Podbrzezie Dolne, Podbrzezie Górne, Radwanów, Słocina, Sokołów, Solniki, Studzieniec, Stypułów, Wolnica and Zawada.

Neighbouring gminas
Gmina Kożuchów is bordered by the gminas of Brzeźnica, Nowa Sól, Nowe Miasteczko, Nowogród Bobrzański, Otyń, Szprotawa and Zielona Góra.

Twin towns – sister cities

Gmina Kożuchów is twinned with:
 Schwepnitz, Germany

References

Kozuchow
Nowa Sól County